Darreh Heydar (also Romanized as Darreh Ḩeydar, Darreh Heidar, and Darreh-ye Ḩeydar) is a village in Khomeh Rural District, in the Central District of Aligudarz County, Lorestan Province, Iran. At the 2006 census, its population was 150, in 34 families.

References 

Towns and villages in Aligudarz County